Sergei Vladimirovich Kopnin (born 1 September 1976) is a former Russian professional football player.

External links
 

1976 births
People from Rybinsk
Living people
Russian footballers
Association football defenders
Russian Premier League players
FC Tekstilshchik Kamyshin players
FC Rotor Volgograd players
FC Shinnik Yaroslavl players
FC Luch Vladivostok players
FC Sibir Novosibirsk players
FC Metallurg Lipetsk players
FC Sakhalin Yuzhno-Sakhalinsk players
FC Khimik Dzerzhinsk players
FC Dynamo Vologda players
FC Znamya Truda Orekhovo-Zuyevo players
FC Nosta Novotroitsk players
FC Dynamo Kirov players
Sportspeople from Yaroslavl Oblast